Tamar Jacoby (born 1954) is president of Opportunity America, a Washington-based nonprofit working to promote economic mobility – work, skills, careers, ownership and entrepreneurship for poor and working Americans. She was formerly president of ImmigrationWorks USA, a national federation of small business owners working to advance immigration reform. A former journalist and author, Jacoby was a senior writer and justice editor at Newsweek and, before that, the deputy editor of The New York Times op-ed page.

Life and career
Jacoby was born in New York City, the daughter of Alberta (née Smith), a university lecturer and filmmaker, and Irving A. Jacoby, a documentary film director. Her brother is documentary director Oren Jacoby. 

After graduating from Yale University in 1976, Jacoby spent a year in Paris working for the Hudson Institute. Back in New York, she became assistant to the editor of the New York Review of Books. From 1981 to 1987, she was the deputy editor of the New York Times op-ed page and, from 1987 to 1989, a senior writer and justice editor at Newsweek. 

In 1990, Jacoby devoted herself full-time to an independent writing career. From the early 1990s through 2007, she was a senior fellow at the Manhattan Institute. In  2010-11, she held a Bosch fellowship at the American Academy in Berlin. In 2012-13, she was a Bernard L. Schwartz fellow at New America. From 2004 to 2010, she served on the advisory board of the National Endowment for the Humanities.

She founded ImmigrationWorks USA in 2006 and Opportunity America in 2014.

Her articles have appeared in The New York Times, The Wall Street Journal, The Washington Post, The Weekly Standard and Foreign Affairs, among other publications.

Her 1998 book, Someone Else’s House: America’s Unfinished Struggle for Integration (Free Press), tells the story of race relations in three American cities – New York, Detroit and Atlanta. Her edited volumes include Reinventing the Melting Pot: The New Immigrants and What It Means to Be American (Basic Books) and This Way Up: New Thinking About Poverty and Economic Mobility (American Enterprise Institute).

Jacoby has also taught at various educational institutions, including Yale University, New York University, Cooper Union and The New School for Social Research.

References

1954 births
Living people
Writers from New York City
American political writers
Jewish American writers
Yale University alumni
American women non-fiction writers
21st-century American Jews
21st-century American women